Licia dolce Licia is an Italian television series. It is one of the four live adaptations of the Japanese manga Ai Shite Knight. It is the sequel to Love me Licia and was followed by Teneramente Licia and Balliamo e cantiamo con Licia.

Cast

See also
List of Italian television series

External links
 

Italian television series
Italia 1 original programming
Television shows based on manga